Božidar Pešić (born 1952) is a Serbian architect and former basketball player.

Playing career 
Pešić played for a Belgrade-based team Crvena zvezda of the Yugoslav First League for five seasons, from 1970 to 1975. His teammates were Zoran Slavnić, Dragan Kapičić, Ljubodrag Simonović, Dragiša Vučinić, and Goran Rakočević among others. With them, he won a FIBA European Cup Winners' Cup in 1974, a Yugoslav Championships, and three National Cups.

Career achievements 
 FIBA European Cup Winners' Cup winner: 1 (with Crvena zvezda: 1973–74).
 Yugoslav League champion: 1 (with Crvena zvezda: 1971–72).
 Yugoslav Cup winner: 3 (with Crvena zvezda: 1970–71, 1972–73, 1974–75).

Personal life 
Pešić and his wife Ann has three sons; Ljubiša, Mihajlo, and Aleksandar. His wife Ann was born in Dublin, Ireland. His son Mihajlo (born 1981) is a professional basketball player.

See also 
 List of KK Crvena zvezda players with 100 games played

References

1952 births
Living people
Basketball players from Belgrade
Centers (basketball)
KK Crvena zvezda players
Serbian architects
Serbian men's basketball players
Yugoslav men's basketball players
Date of birth missing (living people)